Unseen Forces is an extant 1920 silent film drama directed by Sidney Franklin and starring Sylvia Breamer and Conrad Nagel. It was long thought to be lost until a copy was located in New Zealand. It was produced by the same production company that produced The Miracle Man the year before, Mayflower Productions.

Excellent print held by New Zealand archive with copy repatriated to Library of Congress.

Cast
Sylvia Breamer - Miriam Holt
Rosemary Theby - Winifred
Conrad Nagel - Clyde Brunton
Robert Cain - Arnold Crane
Sam De Grasse - Captain Stanley
Edward Martindel - George Brunton
Harry Garrity - Peter Holt
James O. Barrows - Joe Simmons
Aggie Herring - Mrs. Leslie
Andrew Arbuckle - Mr. Leslie
Albert R. Cody - Henry Leslie

References

External links

 "Unseen Forces" filmpreservation.org

1920 films
American silent feature films
Films based on works by Robert W. Chambers
First National Pictures films
Films directed by Sidney Franklin
1920s rediscovered films
American black-and-white films
Silent American drama films
1920 drama films
Rediscovered American films
1920s American films